Take My Word For It is a 30–episode TVB drama broadcast between November 2002 and December 2002.

Synopsis
The story follows the lead characters through their experiences as members of the Police Negotiation Cadre (PNC). The PNC is a volunteer unit of the Hong Kong police force specializing in negotiations with terrorist members, partakers of local violence, and individuals contemplating suicide. The whole series is dotted with both large and small cases handled by the story's heroes and heroines.
There is a love square between Pang Kwok-Tung (Bobby Au-Yeung), Kan Kit (Kenix Kwok), Mok Ka-Chung (Moses Chan) and Poon Man-Ching (Winnie Yeung). Bobby Au-Yeung later finds out that Winnie is cheating on him and secretly meeting Moses, Kenix Kwok's husband. Moses and Winnie leave Hong Kong, however, Moses returns to Hong Kong with the news that Winnie has once again separated from her husband and found another man. Yeung Kwong and Ip Ho-Yan have a comical love relationship, and marry in the end. Eventually, Bobby and Kenix get together. Many problems also happen in Yeung Kwong's (Julian Cheung) family. He is not his father's biological son (although he is favoured over his three siblings). Ip Ho-Yan (Annie Man) has a brief relationship with Julian Cheung's brother, Yeung Hau-Mo (Ellesmere Choi), but it ends when Ellesmere Choi cannot forget his previous girlfriend. Ip Ho-Yan and Julian Cheung start off as beginners learning about PNC. Towards the end, they become professional members of the PNC, and even stop their own instructor, Pang Kwok-Tung (Bobby Au-Yeung) from committing suicide.

Cast
 Bobby Au-Yeung as Pang Kwok-Tung
 Julian Cheung as Yeung Kwong
 Kenix Kwok as Kan Kit
 Annie Man as Ip Ho-Yan
 Moses Chan as Mok Ka-Chung
 Winnie Yeung as Poon Man-Ching
 Ellesmere Choi as Yeung Hau-Mo
 Leila Tong as Ip Ho-Oi
 Catherine Chau as Ip Ho-Hei
 Law Lok Lam as Yeung Sau-Yip
 Yu Chi Ming as Pang Tai-Fuk
 Angelina Lo as Tang Siu-Lan
 Lee Sing Cheung as Pang Kwok-Fu
 Yu Mo Lin as Cheuk Siu-Bing
 Wai Kar Hung as Chai Ka-Chuen
 Kenneth Ma as part of SDU (police, very small role)

Awards and achievements
TVB Anniversary Awards (2003)
 "Top 10 Favorite Characters" (Julian Cheung - Yeung Kwong)

External links
TVB.com Take My Word For It - Official Website 
TVB.com Take My Word For It - TVBI Official Website 

TVB dramas
2002 Hong Kong television series debuts
2002 Hong Kong television series endings